Anacithara minutistriata is a species of sea snail, a marine gastropod mollusk in the family Horaiclavidae.

Description
The length of the ovate, dirty white, semitransparent shell attains 10.5 mm, its diameter 3½ mm. It contains 7½ whorls. The aperture is ovate. The outer lip is thickened close to the lowest rib and is hardly sinuate..The columella has a slight callus.  The wide siphonal canal is very short.

Distribution

References

External links
  Tucker, J.K. 2004 Catalog of recent and fossil turrids (Mollusca: Gastropoda). Zootaxa 682:1–1295.

minutistriata
Gastropods described in 1882